Universal Storage Platform (USP) was the brand name for an Hitachi Data Systems line of computer data storage disk arrays circa 2004 to 2010.

History 

The Hitachi Universal Storage Platform was first introduced in 2004. 
An entry level enterprise and high-end midrange model, the Network Storage Controller was introduced in 2005. The Universal Storage Platform was one of the first disk arrays to virtualize other disk arrays in the appliance instead of in the network.

The second generation Universal Storage Platform V replaced the original Universal Storage Platform in 2007
and the Universal Storage Platform VM replacing the original Network Storage Controller also in 2007.

Architecture 

At the core of the Universal Storage Platform V and VM is a fully fault tolerant, high performance, non-blocking, silicon based switched architecture designed to provide the bandwidth needed to support infrastructure consolidation of enterprise file and block-based storage services on and behind a single platform.

Notable features include:

Supports online local and distance replication and migration of data non disruptively internally and between heterogeneous storage, without interrupting application i/o through use of products such as  Tiered Storage Manager, ShadowImage, TrueCopy  and Universal Replicator.
Enables virtualization of external SAN storage from Hitachi and other vendors into one pool
Storage partitioning provides the ability to host multiple applications on a single storage system without allowing the actions of one set of users to affect the Quality of Service of others.
Supports thin provisioning and storage reclamation on internal and external virtualized storage
Provides encryption, WORM and data shredding services, data resilience and business continuity services and content management services.

Specifications 

Universal Storage Platform V Specifications

Frames (Cabinets) - Integrated Control/Drive Group Frame and 1 to 4 optional Drive Group Frames
Universal Star Network Crossbar Switch - Number of switches 8
Aggregate bandwidth (GB/sec) - 106
Aggregate IOPS - Over 4 million
Cache Memory - Number of cache modules 1-32, Module capacity 8 or 16GB, Maximum cache memory 512GB
Control/Shared Memory - Number of control memory modules 1-8, Module capacity 4GB, Maximum control memory 28GB
Front End Directors (Connectivity)
Number of Directors 1-14
Fibre Channel host ports per Director - 8 or 16
Fibre Channel port performance - 4, 8 Gbit/s
Maximum Fibre Channel host ports - 224
Virtual host ports - 1,024 per physical port
Maximum IBM FICON host ports - 112
Maximum IBM ESCON host ports - 112
Logical Devices (LUNs) — Maximum Supported
Open systems 65,536
IBM z/OS 65,536
Disks
Type: Flash 73, 146, 200 and 400GB
Type: Fibre Channel 146, 300, 450 and 600GB
Type: SATA II 1TB, 2TB
Number of disks per system (min/max) 4-1,152
Number spare disks per system (min/max) 1-40
Maximum Internal Raw Capacity - (2TB disks) 2,268 TB
Maximum Usable Capacity -  RAID-5
Open systems (2TB disks) 1,972 TB
z/OS-compatible (1TB disks) 931 TB
Maximum Usable Capacity — RAID-6
Open systems (2TB disks) 1,690TB
 z/OS-compatible (1TB disks) 796 TB
Maximum Usable Capacity — RAID-1+
Open systems (2TB disks) 1,130TB
z/OS-compatible (1TB disks) 527.4TB
Other Features
RAID 1, 10, 5, 6 support
Maximum internal and external capacity 247PB
Virtual Storage Machines 32 max
Back end directors 1-8
Operating System Support
Mainframe - Fujitsu: MSP; IBM z/OS, z/OS.e, z/VM, TPF; Red Hat; Linux for IBM S/390 and zSeries; SUSE: Linux Enterprise Server for System z.
Open systems -  HP: HP-UX, Tru64 UNIX, Open VMS; IBM AIX; Microsoft Windows Server 2000, 2003, 2008; Novell NetWare; SUSE Linux Enterprise Server; Red Hat Enterprise Linux; SGI IRIX; Sun Microsystems Solaris; VMware ESX and Vsphere, Citrix XENserver

Storage management 

The Hitachi Storage Command Suite (formerly the HiCommand Storage Management Suite) provides integrated storage resource management, tiered storage and business continuity software solutions allowing customers to align their storage with application requirements based upon metrics including Quality-of-Service, Service Level Objectives, Recovery Time Objectives and Recovery Point Objectives.

Open Standards management interfaces such as SNMP and SMI-S are also supported.

Models
Universal Storage Platform family models.  Information taken from

External links
 Hitachi Data Systems Home Page

References 

Hitachi storage servers
Computer storage devices